Anatole Vakhnianyn (September 19, 1841 – February 11, 1908), was a Ukrainian political and cultural figure, composer, teacher, and journalist.

Biography

Family Background

Vakhnianyn was born in Sieniawa, Przeworsk County, today a part of Poland but at that time a part of the Austrian Empire.  He came from a clerical family of noble origins; his father, Klym Vakhnianyn, and grandfather, Iakiv Vakhnyanin, were Greek-Catholic priests.   His mother, Karolina Veith, was the daughter of a Czech-German officer stationed at the Przemysl garrison.  Karolina's brother Wilhelm married a Polish woman and was the maternal grandfather of Kazimierz Świtalski, Prime Minister of Poland (1929). The languages spoken in his home were Polish and German. Anatole Vakhnianyn's sister, Antonina, was the maternal grandmother of Ukrainian-American community leader Omelian Pleshkewycz.

Life

After completing studies at Przemysl's gymnasium, in 1859 Vakhnianyn began studying theology in Lviv's seminary. During this time, he came to recognize the deeper "beauty of Ukrainian poetry and prose" and became heavily involved in Ukrainian literature and music.  In 1863, he married Jozefa de Wankowicz, a distant cousin and member of a noble family.  In 1865, Vakhnianyn organized the first Shevchenko concert in western Ukrainian lands, in Przemyśl.  Moving to Vienna in 1865 where he studied philosophy at the University of Vienna, he organized the first Ukrainian student organization there (Sich) and became its first head.

Vakhnianyn returned to Lviv in 1868 and helped to organize the Prosvita Society, an organization dedicated to educational and cultural work among the Ukrainian people that helped lead to a national awakening among them, becoming its first head.  He was also heavily involved in the creation of Ukrainian-language textbooks in the Austrian school system.

Between 1867 and 1870 Vakhnianyn edited the journal Pravda, in 1870 he was a coeditor of the journal Dilo, the main journal of the Ukrainophile movement in western Ukraine, and from 1870 to 1878 he edited Prosvita's journal.

In 1890 he helped initiate the "New Era" movement, dedicated to forging a rapprochement between Poles and Ukrainians in east Galicia.  After most of the other Ukrainophiles broke with the Poles in 1894, Vakhnianyn continued to seek compromise with them, and along with Oleksander Barvinsky was one of the founders of the "Catholic Ruthenian-Social Union", based on the all-Austrian Christian social movement.

Between 1894 and 1900 Vakhnianyn was a member of the Galician Diet and the Austrian parliament. In 1903 he founded the Higher Musical Institute in Lviv, currently the Lviv Conservatory, and became its first director.  Under the pen-name Natal Vakhnianyn, he composed the opera Kupala (written between 1870 and 1892, premiered at the Kharkiv Opera House in 1929), music to Taras Shevchenko's drama Nazar Stodolia, and various literary works.  He also wrote four novels and translated works by Nikolai Gogol and Ivan Turgenev.

Anatole Vakhnianyn died February 11, 1908, and was buried in Lychakivskiy Cemetery.  Those eulogizing him after his death included Ivan Franko and Mykola Lysenko.

References
Inline

Dytyniak Maria  Ukrainian Composers - A Bio-bibliographic Guide - Research report No. 14, 1896, Canadian Institute of Ukrainian Studies, University of Alberta, Canada.
 In Ukrainian: Батенко Т. Анатоль Вахнянин: біля джерел національного відродження" (Львів, 1998).
Batenko, T.  (1998).  Anatole Vakhnianyn: Among the Wells of National Rebirth, Lviv.
 John-Paul Himka  (1999) Religion and Nationality in Western Ukraine, McGill-Queen's Press.  .
Kachkan, Volodimir.  АНАТОЛЬ ВАХНЯНИН І ЙОГО РОЛЬ У РОЗВИТКУ КУЛЬТУРИ ЗАХІДНОЇ УКРАЇНИ (Ukrainian), ("Anatole Vakhnianyn and his role in the flowering of western Ukrainian culture").  Rylsky Institute of Art Studies, Folklore, and Ethnology, National Academy of Sciences, Ukraine.
Vakhnianyn, Anatol  Entry, Encyclopedia of Ukraine, vol. 5 (1993).  Published by Canadian Institute of Ukrainian Studies, University of Toronto.

1841 births
1908 deaths
People from Przeworsk County
People from the Kingdom of Galicia and Lodomeria
University of Vienna alumni
Members of the Diet of Galicia and Lodomeria
Members of the Austrian House of Deputies (1891–1897)
Ukrainian Austro-Hungarians
Ukrainian nobility
Ukrainian writers
Ukrainian politicians before 1991
Ukrainian composers
Ukrainian people of Czech descent
Burials at Lychakiv Cemetery
Prosvita
Polish people of Czech descent